Actaea may refer to:

In Greek mythology: Actaea

In biology:
 Actaea (plant), a genus of flowering plants
 Actaea (crab), a genus of crabs

In astronomy:
 Actaea (moon), the moon of the trans-Neptunian object 120347 Salacia

Other
 Actaea (pilot boat), a New York pilot boat
 Actaea, pseudonym of Elizabeth Cabot Agassiz (1822-1907), naturalist

Genus disambiguation pages

lt:Aktaja
pl:Czerniec (roślina)